The 2018–19 Munster Rugby season was Munster's eighteenth season competing in the Pro14, alongside which they also competed in the European Rugby Champions Cup. It was Johann van Graan's second season as head coach and his first full season in the role, having joined partway through the previous season.

Events
Munster played two pre-season fixtures ahead of the 2018–19 campaign, the first against London Irish, whose directory of rugby is former Munster and Ireland head coach Declan Kidney, and the second against Exeter Chiefs, which was the first meeting between the two clubs. Munster beat London Irish 32–28, but lost 12–0 against Exeter Chiefs.

Drawn alongside French Top 14 champions Castres and English sides Exeter Chiefs and Gloucester, Munster competed in pool 2 of the 2018–19 European Rugby Champions Cup. Munster opened their 2018–19 Pro14 season with a six-try 38–0 victory against South African side Cheetahs in Thomond Park on 1 September 2018. Rory Scannell, Dave Kilcoyne, Tommy O'Donnell, JJ Hanrahan, Dave O'Callaghan and Man-of-the-Match Darren Sweetnam scored the tries, with Hanrahan adding four conversions, in a match that saw Arno Botha, Mike Haley, Joey Carbery and academy players Shane Daly and Gavin Coombes make their competitive debuts for the province, whilst Neil Cronin also made his first appearance for Munster since March 2015.

Tadhg Beirne made his debut for Munster in the provinces 25–10 defeat away to Glasgow Warriors on 7 September 2018. Munster's 64–7 win against Ulster on 29 September 2018 was a record win for the province in the Pro14; Munster's previous record win being 47–0 against Zebre in 2016. In round one of the 2018–19 Champions Cup on 13 October 2018, a try from CJ Stander and five points from the boot of Joey Carbery secured a 10–10 draw in Sandy Park against Exeter Chiefs, in a match in which Dan Goggin and Neil Cronin made their competitive European debuts, whilst Tadhg Beirne, who was Man-of-the-Match, Mike Haley and Joey Carbery made their European debuts for Munster. One week later, tries from Mike Haley, Rhys Marshall, Joey Carbery, who also kicked four conversions and one penalty in a Man-of-the-Match performance, Sammy Arnold and Andrew Conway helped Munster to a 36–22 bonus-point victory at home against Gloucester.

In the December 2018 back-to-back Champions Cup fixtures against Castres, Munster won 30–5 in round 3 on 9 December, with tries from Rory Scannell, CJ Stander and JJ Hanrahan, who also scored 15 points off the kicking tee. In the return leg away to Castres on 15 December, the French side won 13–12, with Joey Carbery scoring all of Munster's points from penalties. In round 5 of the Champions Cup, Munster beat Gloucester 41–15 away from home on 11 January 2019, with  the tries coming from Joey Carbery (2), Rory Scannell, Keith Earls and Andrew Conway and 16 points of the kicking tee from Carbery. In round 6, Munster beat Exeter Chiefs 9–7 in Thomond Park on 19 January 2019 to advance to a record 18th Champions Cup quarter-final. Joey Carbery scored all of Munster's points from penalties in a closely fought, physical game. Munster defeated Edinburgh 17–13 in their quarter-final in Murrayfield Stadium on 30 March 2019 to advance to a 14th Champions Cup semi-final, which Munster lost 32–16 to Saracens in the Ricoh Arena on 20 April 2019.

Munster finished second in conference A in the 2018–19 Pro14 season, with 21 wins and 5 defeats, and beat Italian side Benetton 15–13 in their quarter-final on 4 May 2019, to secure a semi-final against provincial rivals Leinster in the RDS on 18 May 2019. which Leinster won 24–9, bringing to an end Munster's 2018–19 season. During the season, Munster played 31 games, winning 22, losing 8 and drawing 1. The province scored 790 points, including 99 tries, in total, and had the best defensive record during the regular Pro14 season and Champions Cup pool stage, conceding an average of 12 points a game in the latter. In attack, Munster were the third highest try-scorers in the regular Pro14 season with 82 tries in 21 games.

Munster were unbeaten at home all season, winning 10 games in Thomond Park and 4 in Irish Independent Park, and featured in their 18th Champions Cup quarter-final and 14th semi-final, extending records for both. 55 players were used in total throughout the season across all competitions, with 37 of those having followed the Munster pathway into the professional game. 11 players made their debuts for the province: Tadhg Beirne, Arno Botha, Joey Carbery, Mike Haley and Alby Mathewson, as well as 6 academy players: Diarmuid Barron, Craig Casey, Gavin Coombes, Liam Coombes, Shane Daly and Alex McHenry. Stalwart in the second row Billy Holland became the 10th player to win 200 caps for the province, whilst Andrew Conway, JJ Hanrahan, Jack O'Donoghue and Rory Scannell all won their 100th caps for Munster, with Scannell becoming the youngest player to do at the age of 25.  Mike Haley played more minutes than any other player during the season, racking up 1,876 in 26 starts.

Internationally, 13 Munster players represented Ireland during the season: Sammy Arnold, Tadhg Beirne, Joey Carbery, Andrew Conway, Keith Earls, Chris Farrell, Dave Kilcoyne, Niall Scannell, Conor Murray, Peter O'Mahony, CJ Stander, Darren Sweetnam and John Ryan. 11 players were involved in the Ireland under-20s team that won a grand slam during the 2019 Six Nations Under 20s Championship: Craig Casey, Seán French, Ben Healy, James McCarthy, Jonathan Wren and Josh Wycherley from the academy, and Jake Flannery, John Hodnett, Conor Phillips, Luke Masters and Billy Scannell were also involved.

There were 6 sell-out attendances during the season at Thomond Park and Irish Independent Park, with all 4 games at the latter selling-out for the first time. Attendance increased by 15% across the season, with a 10% rise in ticket sales. All 3 of Munster's home Champions Cup pool fixtures were the highest attendance for their respective rounds.

Coaching and management Staff 2018–19

Senior playing squad 2018–19
Munster player movements for the 2018–19 season. For a full list, see List of 2018–19 Pro14 transfers.(Player's name in italics indicates a transfer that took place during the course of the season)

Players in
 Tadhg Beirne from  Scarlets
 Calvin Nash promoted from Academy
 Liam O'Connor promoted from Academy
 Fineen Wycherley promoted from Academy
 Mike Haley from  Sale Sharks
 Neil Cronin from  Garryowen
 Arno Botha from  London Irish
 Joey Carbery from  Leinster
 Alby Mathewson from  Toulon (four-month contract)
 Cronan Gleeson (three-month contract)

Players out
 Simon Zebo to  Racing 92
 Robin Copeland to  Connacht
 David Johnston to  Ealing Trailfinders
 Gerbrandt Grobler to  Gloucester
 Stephen Fitzgerald to  Connacht (three-month loan)
 Ian Keatley to  London Irish (short-term contract)
 Mike Sherry to  Gloucester (loan)
 Ronan O'Mahony retired due to injury

The Munster senior squad for 2018–19 is:

 Internationally capped players in bold
 Players qualified to play for Ireland on residency or dual nationality *
 Irish provinces are currently limited to four non-Irish eligible (NIE) players and one non-Irish qualified player (NIQ or "Project Player").
Notes:

Pre-season

2018–19 Pro14

Round 1

Round 2

Round 3

Round 4

Round 5

Round 6

Round 7

Round 8

Round 9

Round 10

Round 11

Round 12

Round 13

Round 14

Round 15

Round 16

Round 17

Round 18

Round 19

Round 20

Round 21

Quarter-final

Semi-final

2018–19 European Rugby Champions Cup

Munster faced Castres, Exeter Chiefs and Gloucester in pool 2 of the 2018–19 European Rugby Champions Cup. They were seeded in tier 3 following their fourth-place finish overall and exit from the 2017–18 Pro14 season at the semi-finals stage.

Round 1

Round 2

Round 3

Round 4

Round 5

Round 6

Quarter-final

Semi-final

References

External links

2018–19
2018–19 Pro14 by team
2018–19 in Irish rugby union
2018–19 European Rugby Champions Cup by team